Wolf Point station is a train station in Wolf Point, Montana. It is a stop for the Amtrak Empire Builder line. The station, platform, and parking are owned by BNSF Railway. Prior to the formation of Amtrak, the Great Northern Railway operated passenger service along the line.

Station layout

Bibliography

References

External links 

Wolf Point Amtrak Station (USA Rail Guide – Train Web)

Amtrak stations in Montana
Buildings and structures in Roosevelt County, Montana
Former Great Northern Railway (U.S.) stations
1893 establishments in Montana
Railway stations in the United States opened in 1893